RPMG may refer to:
 Patrick Gibbs (1915-2008), British pilot and journalist who sometimes signed articles thus
Dipolog Airport, Philippines, ICAO code: RPMG